Morbid Remix Show is an EP by Norwegian singer-songwriter Bertine Zetlitz. It was released in 1998 by EMI.

Track listing

1998 EPs
Bertine Zetlitz albums
1998 remix albums
Remix EPs